Phyllocladus trichomanoides, the tānekaha or celery pine, is a coniferous tree endemic to New Zealand.

Description 
Tānekaha is a medium-sized forest tree growing up to 25 m in height and 1 m trunk diameter. The main structural shoots are green-skinned for 2–3 years, then turn brown as the bark thickens. The leaves are sparse, tiny, scale-like, 2–3 mm long, and only green (photosynthetic) for a short time, soon turning brown.

Most photosynthesis is performed by phylloclades, highly modified, leaf-like short shoots; these are arranged alternately, 10-15 on a shoot, the individual phylloclades rhombic, 1.5-2.5 cm long. The seed cones are berry-like, with a fleshy white aril surrounding but not fully enclosing the single seed.

Distribution 
In the North Island this species is found in lowland forests from Te Paki to 40°S. In the South Island this species is found in northern Marlborough and Nelson to 41°30'S.

Economic uses
Like the kauri, tānekaha shed their lower branches, producing smooth straight trunks and knot-free timber which is sought after for its strength.

The bark is rich in tannin, from which Māori extracted a red dye.

References

External links

Gymnosperm Database: Phyllocladus trichomanoides

Podocarpaceae
Trees of New Zealand
Trees of mild maritime climate
Least concern plants